Guggari Shanthaveerappa Shivarudrappa (7 February 1926 – 23 December 2013), or colloquially GSS, was an Indian Kannada poet, writer, and researcher who was awarded the title of Rashtrakavi (national poet) by the Government of Karnataka in 2006.

Early life
Shivarudrappa was born on 7 February 1926 in Issur Village, Shikaripura Taluk, in Shivamogga district of Karnataka.  He died on 23 December 2013 in Bangalore. His father was a school teacher. He did his primary and secondary schooling in Shikaripura.

Education 
Shivarudrappa gained his BA in 1949 and MA in 1953 from University of Mysore, having secured gold medals on three occasions. He was a student and follower of Kuvempu and was heavily inspired by Kuvempu's literary works and life.

In 1965, G.S. Shivarudrappa secured a doctorate for his thesis "Soundarya Sameekshe" (Kannada : ಸೌಂದರ್ಯ ಸಮೀಕ್ಷೆ), written under the guidance of Kuvempu, a pioneering work in the field of literary aesthetics.

Professional life
Shivarudrappa started his career in 1949 as a lecturer in Kannada language at the Mysore University. In 1963, he joined Hyderabad's Osmania University as a reader, eventually becoming the head of the Kannada department. He remained at Osmania University until 1966.

In 1966, Shivarudrappa joined the Bangalore University as a professor. He was later elected as the director of the university and he continued to contribute to the university's Kannada Study Center (Kannada : ಕನ್ನಡ ಅಧ್ಯಯನ ಕೇಂದ್ರ).

In cities like Davanagere, Shivamogga, and Mysore, he lectured in Kannada. In 1966, he moved his headquarters to Bangalore University, where he served as Director until his retirement from the government in 1986. From 1987 to 1990, he served as the Karnataka Sahitya Academy's president.

Later life and death 
Shivarudrappa has worked as a Kannada professor at the Maharaja's College, Mysore and later at the Postgraduate Kannada Department of Bangalore University. He died on 23 December 2013 at his Banashankari, Bangalore residence. The State Government declared a two-day mourning in his honour.

Rashtrakavi 
Shivarudrappa was honoured with the title of Rashtrakavi (Sanskrit for "Poet of the Nation") by the Government of Karnataka during the Suvarna Karnataka (Golden Jubilee celebrations of Karnataka) occasion on 1 November, the Kannada Rajyotsava day, 2006.
He was the third Kannada poet to be honoured with this title, after Govinda Pai and Kuvempu.

Literary works

Collection of poems
 Saamagaana
 Cheluvu-Olavu
 Devashilpa
 Deepada Hejje
 Chakragathi
 Anaavarana
 Tereda Daari
 Godhe
 Vyakthamadhya
 Teerthavaani
 Kaarthika
 Kaadina Katthalalli
 Agniparva
 Yede Tumbhi Haadidenu
 Nooraru Kavithegalu 
 Samagra Kavya
 Nana hanathe
 Mera Diya Aur Anya Kavitayen

Criticism
 Parisheelana
 Vimarsheya Poorva Pashchima
 Soundarya Sameekshe (Ph.D. thesis)
 Kaavyaartha Chintana
 Gattibimbha
 Anuranana
 Pratikriye
 Kannada Sahithya Sameekshe
 Mahakavya Swaroopa
 Kannada Kavigala Kaavyakalpane
 Desiyatheyalli Aralida Datta Pratibhe
 Yavudoo Sannadalla
 Pampa : Ondu Adhyayana
 Samagra Kannada Sahitya Charitre – A history of Kannada literature and language and its growth over the centuries
 Kuvempu - Punaravalokana/Kuvempu - a Reappraisal – A biographical work on Kuvempu, done for Government of Karnataka

Travelogues 
 Moscowdalli 22 dina (22 Days in Moscow) – Winner of Soviet Land Nehru Award.
 Englandinalli Chaturmaasa (Four months in England)
 Americadalli Kannadiga (Kannadiga in America)
 Gangeya Shikharagalalli (In the Crest of the River Ganges)

Biography
 Shivayogi Siddarama
 Shri Kuvempu 
 Kavi Bendre 
 Fakeer Mohan Senapathi

Autobiography
 Chaturanga

Works on G. S. Shivarudrappa

 Gourava A Felicitation Volume about the Life and Literature of G. S. Shivarudrappa
 Hanate A Felicitation Volume about the Life and Literature of G. S. Shivarudrappa
 Aakashadeepa A Felicitation Volume about the Life and Literature of G. S. Shivarudrappa
 G. S. Shivarudrappa (Biography) by H. S. Venkateshamurthy
 G. S. S. Sanchaya (An Anthology of Selected Writings)
 Government of Karnataka published his Complete Works in 9 volumes at a subsidized price.

Awards and honours 

 Pampa Award – 1998
 Rashtrakavi Award (Poet of the Nation) – 2006

References

External links 

1926 births
2013 deaths
Kannada people
Kannada poets
Kannada-language writers
People from Shimoga district
Recipients of the Sahitya Akademi Award in Kannada
University of Mysore alumni
Academic staff of Maharaja's College, Mysore
Maharaja's College, Mysore alumni
Rashtrakavi
20th-century Indian poets
Poets from Karnataka
Academic staff of Bangalore University
Indian male poets
20th-century Indian male writers
Academic staff of Osmania University